Sir William Goring (before 1500-1554) was an English landowner, administrator, courtier and politician.

References

1554 deaths
Knights Bachelor
High Sheriffs of Sussex
English MPs 1539–1540
English MPs 1545–1547
English courtiers
Court of Henry VIII
Year of birth uncertain